Rain is a sculpture by Jovian, installed along Puerto Vallarta's Malecón, in the Mexican state of Jalisco. The , tall statue weighs 650 kilograms  and depicts "a young man who, with open arms and gaze to the sky, welcomes both residents and visitors alike". The sculpture has been valued at US$60,000 and was donated by the artist via Galería Corsica.

References

External links

 

Centro, Puerto Vallarta
Outdoor sculptures in Puerto Vallarta
Sculptures of men in Mexico
Statues in Jalisco